This is a list of player transfers involving Premiership Rugby teams before or during the 2022–23 season.

The list is of deals that are confirmed and are either from or to a rugby union team in the Premiership during the 2021–22 season. It is not unknown for confirmed deals to be cancelled at a later date.

Bath

Players In
 Orlando Bailey promoted from Academy 
 Max Ojomoh promoted from Academy
 Niall Annett from  Worcester Warriors 
 Matt Gallagher from  Munster
 Wesley White from  Jersey Reds
 Louis Schreuder from  Newcastle Falcons 
 Chris Cloete from  Munster 
 Dave Attwood from  Bristol Bears
 Piers Francis from  Northampton Saints
 Ewan Richards promoted from Academy
 JJ Tonks from  Northampton Saints 
 Louie Hennessey from  Cardiff
 GJ van Velze from  Tel Aviv Heat
 Aranos Coetzee from  Free State Cheetahs (short-term deal)
 Quinn Roux from  Toulon 
 Michael Etete from  Leeds Tykes
 Valery Morozov from  Worcester Warriors
 Ollie Lawrence from  Worcester Warriors
 Fergus Lee-Warner from  Worcester Warriors
 Billy Searle from  Worcester Warriors (short-term deal) 
 Jamie Shillcock from  Worcester Warriors (short-term deal)
 Ted Hill from  Worcester Warriors
 Alfie Barbeary from  Wasps
 Daniel Marais from  Paul Roos Gymnasium
 Luke Graham from  Paul Roos Gymnasium
 Harvey Cuckson from  Worcester Warriors
 Elliot Millar-Mills from  Wasps (short-term deal)

Players Out
 Taulupe Faletau to  Cardiff 
 Max Clark to  Dragons 
 Semesa Rokoduguni to  Montauban 
 Valery Morozov to  Worcester Warriors
 Tian Schoeman to  Newcastle Falcons
 Danny Cipriani released
 Anthony Watson to  Leicester Tigers
 Jacques du Toit to  Zebre Parma 
 Ollie Fox to  Ealing Trailfinders
 Harry Casson released
 Ma'afu Fia returned to  Ospreys
 Tom Prydie released
 Joe Simpson returned to  Gloucester
 Will Vaughan released
 Aranos Coetzee to  Free State Cheetahs
 Jamie Shillcock to  Mitsubishi DynaBoars
 Billy Searle released
 Mike Williams to  Exeter Chiefs
 Tom Ellis to  Saracens (short-term loan)

Bristol Bears

Players In
 AJ MacGinty from  Sale Sharks 
 Ellis Genge from  Leicester Tigers 
 Magnus Bradbury from  Edinburgh
 Gabriel Ibitoye from  Tel Aviv Heat
 James Williams from  Hartpury University
 Rhys Charalambous from  Leeds Beckett University 
 Fred Davies from  Durham University
 Martin Mulhall from  Swansea University
 Richard Lane from  Bedford Blues 
 Jono Benz-Salomon from  Hartpury University 
 Toti Benz-Salomon from  Hartpury University
 Oscar Lennon from  Hartpury University
 Joe Owen from  Clifton
 Morgan Eames from  Béziers
 Sam Lewis from  Worcester Warriors
 Joe Batley from  Worcester Warriors
 Will Porter from  Wasps
 Jay Tyack from  Worcester Warriors (short-term deal)
 Noah Heward from  Worcester Warriors
 Elliott Stooke from  Wasps (short-term deal)

Players Out
 Dave Attwood to  Bath 
 Antoine Frisch to  Munster 
 John Afoa to  Vannes 
 Niyi Adeolokun released
 Joe Cotton released
 Theo Strang released
 James Dun to  Jersey Reds (season-long loan)
 Charlie Powell to  Jersey Reds (season-long loan)
 Tiff Eden to  Zebre Parma
 Ashley Challenger to  Chartres
 Lucas Berti-Newman to  Montpellier
 Nathan Hughes to  Black Rams Tokyo 
 Alapati Leiua to  Stormers
 Mitch Eadie to  Toronto Arrows
 Martin Mulhall to  Northampton Saints (short-term loan)
 Jake Armstrong to  Doncaster Knights 
 Luke Morahan to  Bayonne
 Elliott Stooke to  Montpellier
 Tom Whiteley to  Leicester Tigers

Exeter Chiefs

Players In
 Jack Dunne from  Leinster 
 Rory O'Loughlin from  Leinster
 Aidon Davis from  Free State Cheetahs 
 Iestyn Harris from  Cardiff
 Ruben van Heerden from  Sharks
 Solomone Kata from  Moana Pasifika
 Scott Sio from  Brumbies 
 Jacob Morris from  University of Exeter 
 Fin Richardson from  University of Exeter
 Dan Frost from  Wasps (short-term deal)
 Alfie Bell from  Wasps
 Immanuel Feyi-Waboso from  Wasps
 Greg Fisilau from  Wasps
 Mike Williams from  Bath
 Nika Abuladze from  Black Lion
 Ehren Painter from  Northampton Saints

Players Out
 Sam Skinner to  Edinburgh 
 Jonny Hill to  Sale Sharks 
 Sam Hidalgo-Clyne to  Benetton 
 Sean Lonsdale to  Dragons
 Tom O'Flaherty to  Sale Sharks 
 Don Armand retired
 Sam Nixon to  Grenoble 
 Jack Walsh to  Ospreys
 Aaron Hinkley to  Northampton Saints 
 Alfie Petch to  Northampton Saints
 Jordon Poole to  Coventry 
 Shea Cornish to  Coventry (season-long loan) 
 Danny Southworth to  Coventry (season-long loan)
 Will Witty to  Perpignan
 Ruben van Heerden to  Stormers
 Santiago Grondona to  Pau
 Facundo Cordero to  Glasgow Warriors

Gloucester

Players In
 Albert Tuisue from  London Irish
 George Barton promoted from Academy 
 Jack Clement promoted from Academy
 Stephen Varney promoted from Academy
 Mayco Vivas from  Jaguares XV
 Seb Atkinson from  Worcester Warriors
 Alex Hearle from  Worcester Warriors
 Finn Theobold-Thomas from  Worcester Warriors
 Josh Hathaway from  Scarlets
 Archie MacArthur from  Wasps
 Gareth Blackmore from  Western Province
 Tom Miles from  Worcester Warriors
 George McGuigan from  Newcastle Falcons

Players Out
 Will Britton to  Cornish Pirates 
 Jack Stanley released
 Olly Adkins to  Cornish Pirates (season-long loan)
 Josh Gray to  Jersey Reds (season-long loan)
 Toby Venner to  Jersey Reds
 Seb Nagle-Taylor to  Cornish Pirates
 Joe Simpson to  Sale Sharks
 Ed Slater retired
 Jason Woodward to  Sale Sharks
 Andrew Davidson to  Ealing Trailfinders

Harlequins

Players In
 Sam Riley promoted from Academy
 Matas Jurevicius promoted from Academy
 Irné Herbst from  Benetton 
 Jack Stafford promoted from Academy 
 George Hammond promoted from Academy 
 Jack Kenningham promoted from Academy 
 Jack Musk promoted from Academy
 Charlie Matthews from  Kamaishi Seawaves 
 Lennox Anyanwu promoted from Academy
 Fin Baxter promoted from Academy
 Oscar Beard promoted from Academy
 George Head promoted from Academy
 Josh Bassett from  Wasps

Players Out
 Hugh Tizard to  Saracens 
 Matt Symons retired
 Joe Gray retired 
 Huw Jones to  Glasgow Warriors
 Craig Trenier retired
 Mak Wilson to  Doncaster Knights
 Christian Scotland-Williamson retired

Leicester Tigers

Players In
 Handré Pollard from  Montpellier 
 James Cronin from  Biarritz 
 Phil Cokanasiga from  London Irish 
 Olly Cracknell from  London Irish
 Jimmy Gopperth from  Wasps 
 Anthony Watson from  Bath
 Joe Taufeteʻe from  LA Giltinis 
 Lachlan Shelley from  Eastwood 
 Tom Horton from  NSW Waratahs (short-term deal)
 Charlie Atkinson from  Wasps 
 Gabriel Oghre from  Wasps (short-term deal)
 Sam Wolstenholme from  Wasps (short-term deal)
 Tom West from  Wasps 
 Cameron Miell from  Paul Roos Gymnasium
 Tom Whiteley from  Bristol Bears
 Mike Brown from  Newcastle Falcons (short-term deal)

Players Out
 George Ford to  Sale Sharks 
 Ellis Genge to  Bristol Bears
 Jonny Law to  Jersey Reds
 Matías Moroni to  Newcastle Falcons 
 Olly Robinson returned to  Cardiff
 Jack Rowntree released
 Tomiwa Agbongbon to  Loughborough Students 
 Jaco Taute retired
 Sam Aspland-Robinson to  Rosslyn Park 
 Jordan Olowofela to  Nottingham
 Juan Pablo Socino to  UE Santboiana
 Nemani Nadolo to  NSW Waratahs
 Bryce Hegarty to  Western Force
 Marco van Staden to  Bulls
 Gabriel Oghre to  Bordeaux
 Lachlan Shelley released
 Richard Wigglesworth retired
 Freddie Burns to  Highlanders
 Tom Cowan-Dickie to  Ospreys 
 Tom Horton to  Western Force

London Irish

Players In
 Tom Pearson promoted from Academy
 Danilo Fischetti from  Zebre Parma 
 Will Joseph promoted from Academy
 Henry Arundell promoted from Academy
 Luca Morisi from  Benetton 
 Tom Hitchcock from  University of Exeter 
 Josh Basham from  Newcastle Falcons 
 Josh Caulfield from  Cornish Pirates
 Ed Scragg from  Cornish Pirates
 Api Ratuniyarawa from  Northampton Saints
 Joe Powell from  Melbourne Rebels 
 So'otala Fa'aso'o from  Brive
 Isaac Miller from  Worcester Warriors 
 Logan Trotter from  Stirling County
 Patrick Harrison from  Edinburgh (short-term loan)
 Jamie Jack from  Edinburgh (short-term loan)
 Ignacio Ruiz from  Jaguares XV 
 Eddie Poolman from  Sydney University

Players Out
 Albert Tuisue to  Gloucester
 Terrence Hepetema to  Grenoble 
 Steve Mafi to  Oyonnax 
 Seán O'Brien retired 
 George Nott to  Dragons
 Phil Cokanasiga to  Leicester Tigers
 Olly Cracknell to  Leicester Tigers
 George Davis retired 
 Jamie Dever released
 Rory Morgan released
 Cillian Redmond released
 Marcus Rhodes released
 Theo Smerdon retired
 Alandré van Rooyen released
 Rory Brand to  Watsonian 
 Marcel van der Merwe to  Brive
 Allan Dell to  Glasgow Warriors 
 Nick Phipps to  Green Rockets Tokatsu 
 Noel Reid to  Toronto Arrows 
 Curtis Rona to

Newcastle Falcons

Players In
 Freddie Lockwood promoted from Academy
 Iwan Stephens promoted from Academy
 Tian Schoeman from  Bath
 Josh Peters from  Doncaster Knights
 Conrad Cade promoted from Academy
 Josh Thomas from  Ospreys
 Sebastian de Chaves from  Austin Gilgronis
 Josh Barton from  Coventry 
 Matías Moroni from  Leicester Tigers
 Vereimi Qorowale from  British Army
 Elliott Obatoyinbo from  Saracens
 Alun Walker from  Ealing Trailfinders (short-term loan)
 Pedro Rubiolo from  Jaguares XV
 Corbin Thunder from  Wasps
 Oisín Heffernan from  Northampton Saints (short-term loan)

Players Out
 Louis Schreuder to  Bath
 Will Haydon-Wood to  Wasps
 Robbie Smith to  Northampton Saints
 Rob Farrar to  Ealing Trailfinders
 Will Montgomery to  Ealing Trailfinders
 Josh Basham to  London Irish
 Luther Burrell released 
 Kyle Cooper released
 Ollie Lindsay-Hague released
 Mathew Ward released
 Max Wright returned to  Bath
 Marco Fuser to  Massy
 Morgan Passman to  Darlington Mowden Park 
 Oscar Caudle to  Tynedale 
 Joel Hodgson to  Utah Warriors
 George Merrick to  Carcassonne
 George McGuigan to  Gloucester
 Nathan Earle to  Ealing Trailfinders
 Mike Brown to  Leicester Tigers
 Trevor Davison to  Northampton Saints

Northampton Saints

Players In
 Callum Braley from  Benetton 
 Ethan Waller from  Worcester Warriors 
 Lukhan Salakaia-Loto from  Queensland Reds
 Angus Scott-Young from  Queensland Reds
 Sam Graham from  Doncaster Knights  
 Robbie Smith from  Newcastle Falcons
 James Ramm from  NSW Waratahs
 Aaron Hinkley from  Exeter Chiefs
 Alfie Petch from  Exeter Chiefs
 Martin Mulhall from  Bristol Bears (short-term loan)
 Fin Smith from  Worcester Warriors
 Tom Cruse from  Edinburgh
 Trevor Davison from  Newcastle Falcons

Players Out
 Teimana Harrison to  Provence
 Piers Francis to  Bath
 Conor Carey released
 Connor Tupai released
 Ollie Newman to  Ealing Trailfinders
 Tom Wood retired 
 Josh Gillespie to  Ealing Trailfinders
 JJ Tonks to  Bath
 Karl Garside to  Doncaster Knights 
 Nick Auterac to  Edinburgh
 Api Ratuniyarawa to  London Irish
 Ahsee Tuala to  Counties Manukau
 Leroy O'Neil to  Bury St Edmunds
 Reece Marshall to  Chinnor
 Taqele Naiyaravoro to  Green Rockets Tokatsu
 Pete White to  Ampthill
 Ethan Thorne to  Oyonnax
 Duane RatuVilai Willemsen retired
 Dan Biggar to  Toulon 
 Josh Weru released
 Ehren Painter to  Exeter Chiefs
 Oisín Heffernan to  Newcastle Falcons (short-term loan)

Sale Sharks

Players In
 George Ford from  Leicester Tigers
 Jonny Hill from  Exeter Chiefs
 Tom O'Flaherty from  Exeter Chiefs
 Joe Simpson from  Gloucester (short-term deal)
 Jason Woodward from  Gloucester
 Ryan Mills from  Wasps
 Rekeiti Ma'asi-White from  Wasps
 Asher Opoku from  Wasps
 Alex Wills from  Worcester Warriors

Players Out
 AJ MacGinty to  Bristol Bears
 JP du Preez to  Glasgow Warriors 
 Curtis Langdon to  Worcester Warriors 
 Cameron Neild to  Worcester Warriors
 Faf de Klerk to  Yokohama Canon Eagles
 Rohan Janse van Rensburg to  Sharks
 Simon Hammersley retired 
 Lood de Jager to  Saitama Wild Knights 
 Jack Metcalf to  Ealing Trailfinders
 Joe Simpson retired 
 Marland Yarde to  Bayonne

Saracens

Players In
 Hugh Tizard from  Harlequins
 Christian Judge from  Worcester Warriors
 Eduardo Bello from  Zebre Parma
 James Flynn from  Jersey Reds
 Cameron Boon promoted from Academy
 Sam Crean promoted from Academy 
 Theo Dan promoted from Academy
 Josh Hallett promoted from Academy
 Toby Knight promoted from Academy
 Ollie Stonham promoted from Academy
 Tom Howe from  Worcester Warriors (short-term deal)
 Andrew Kitchener from  Worcester Warriors (short-term deal)
 Robin Hislop from  Wasps (short-term deal)
 Gareth Simpson from  Worcester Warriors (short-term deal)
 Olly Hartley from  Wasps 
 Francois Hougaard from  Wasps (short-term deal)
 Tom Ellis from  Bath (short-term loan)

Players Out
 Vincent Koch to  Wasps
 Sean Reffell to  Ulster
 Richard Barrington to  Agen
 Tim Swinson retired
 Charlie Watson released
 Harvey Beaton to  Cornish Pirates (season-long loan)
 Tom Mills to  Richmond
 Elliott Obatoyinbo to  Newcastle Falcons
 Janco Venter to  Griquas
 Gareth Simpson to  Western Force
 Sam Wainwright to  Scarlets

Wasps

Players In
 Vincent Koch from  Saracens
 Immanuel Feyi-Waboso from  Cardiff
 Olly Hartley promoted from Academy 
 Burger Odendaal from  Lions 
 Kiran McDonald from  Glasgow Warriors 
 John Ryan from  Munster
 Will Haydon-Wood from  Newcastle Falcons
 Harry Craven from  Durham University
 Cam Dodson from  Austin Gilgronis

Players Out
 Thomas Young to  Cardiff
 Vaea Fifita to  Scarlets 
 Malakai Fekitoa to  Munster 
 Jimmy Gopperth to  Leicester Tigers
 Rob Miller released 
 Jeffrey Toomaga-Allen to  Ulster
 Michael Le Bourgeois to  Bedford Blues 
 Pieter Scholtz to  Bayonne 
 Marcus Watson to  Benetton
 Alex Pleasants to  Leeds Tykes
 James Gaskell to  Toyota Industries Shuttles Aichi
 Cameron Anderson to  London Scottish
 Josh Bassett to  Harlequins
 Biyi Alo to  Racing 92
 Will Simonds to  Chinnor
 Will Porter to  Bristol Bears
 Cam Dodson to  Aurillac 
 John Ryan to  Munster 
 Brad Shields to  Perpignan 
 Robin Hislop to  Saracens
 Vincent Koch to  Stade Francais 
 Paolo Odogwu to  Stade Francais
 Dan Frost to  Exeter Chiefs
 Kiran McDonald to  Munster 
 Charlie Atkinson to  Leicester Tigers 
 Matteo Minozzi to  Benetton 
 Nizaam Carr to  Bulls 
 Ryan Mills to  Sale Sharks
 Tom Bacon to  Ampthill
 Rob Hardwick to  Ampthill
 James Tunney to  Ampthill
 Luke Mehson to  London Scottish
 Theo Vukašinović to  Doncaster Knights 
 Ben Morris to  Birmingham Moseley
 Tom Willis to  Bordeaux
 Ali Crossdale to  Perpignan 
 Archie MacArthur to  Gloucester
 Alfie Bell to  Exeter Chiefs
 Immanuel Feyi-Waboso to  Exeter Chiefs
 Greg Fisilau to  Exeter Chiefs
 Dan Robson to  Pau 
 Fyn Brown to  Ampthill
 Jacob Umaga to  Benetton
 Michael van Vuuren to  Lions 
 Rekeiti Ma'asi-White to  Sale Sharks 
 Asher Opoku to  Sale Sharks
 Olly Hartley  to  Saracens
 Joe Launchbury to  Toyota Verblitz 
 Alfie Barbeary to  Bath
 Gabriel Oghre to  Leicester Tigers
 Tom Cruse to  Edinburgh
 Will Haydon-Wood to  Massy 
 Jack Willis to  Toulouse 
 Sam Spink to  Western Force
 Burger Odendaal to  Toshiba Brave Lupus Tokyo 
 Francois Hougaard to  Saracens
 Elliott Stooke to  Bristol Bears
 Eparama Rokodrava to  Ealing Trailfinders
 Kieran Curran to  Bedford Blues 
 Elliot Millar-Mills to  Bath
 Zach Kibirige to  Western Force
 Tom West to  Leicester Tigers
 Tim Cardall to  Melbourne Rebels
 Corbin Thunder to  Newcastle Falcons

Worcester Warriors

Players In
 Curtis Langdon from  Sale Sharks
 Cameron Neild from  Sale Sharks
 Fergus Lee-Warner from  Western Force
 Santiago Medrano from  Western Force 
 Hame Faiva from  Benetton 
 Valery Morozov from  Bath 
 Renato Giammarioli from  Zebre Parma

Players Out
 Ethan Waller to  Northampton Saints
 Niall Annett to  Bath 
 Sione Vailanu to  Glasgow Warriors
 Matt Garvey retired
 Christian Judge to  Saracens
 Joe Morris released
 Ben Murphy released
 Joe Richardson released
 Cheick Kone to  Colorno
 James Scott to  Jersey Reds
 Isaac Miller to  London Irish
 Marc Thomas to  Cardiff RFC
 Melani Nanai to  Bay of Plenty 
 Caleb Montgomery to  Ampthill
 Kyle Hatherell to  La Rochelle 
 Sam Lewis to  Bristol Bears
 Renato Giammarioli to  Bordeaux
 Ted Hill to  Bath
 Ollie Lawrence to  Bath
 Fergus Lee-Warner to  Bath
 Valery Morozov to  Bath
 Duhan van der Merwe to  Edinburgh
 Joe Batley to  Bristol Bears
 Rory Sutherland to  Ulster
 Fin Smith to  Northampton Saints 
 Kai Owen to  Doncaster Knights
 Tom Howe to  Saracens 
 Andrew Kitchener to  Saracens
 Will Chudley to  Coventry 
 Tom Dodd to  Coventry 
 Curtis Langdon to  Montpellier
 Francois Venter to  Sharks
 Seb Atkinson to  Gloucester 
 Alex Hearle to  Gloucester
 Finn Theobold-Thomas to  Gloucester
 Ashley Beck to  Merthyr
 Billy Searle to  Bath
 Jamie Shillcock to  Bath
 Will Butler to  Hartpury University
 Oli Morris to  Munster
 Santiago Medrano to  Western Force 
 Jay Tyack to  Bristol Bears
 Noah Heward to  Bristol Bears
 Gareth Simpson to  Saracens 
 Beck Cutting to  Ampthill
 Harri Doel to  Llandovery
 Cameron Neild to  Glasgow Warriors 
 Matt Kvesic to  Zebre Parma 
 Owen Williams to  Ospreys
 Lewis Holsey to  Bedford Blues
 Tobi Wilson to  Birmingham Moseley
 Harvey Cuckson to  Bath
 Alex Wills to  Sale Sharks
 Theo Mayall to  RGC 1404
 Tom Miles to  Gloucester
 Ollie Wynn to  Chester
 Jack Forsythe to  Birmingham Moseley
 Murray McCallum to  Edinburgh
 Will Couch to  Scarlets

See also
List of 2022–23 United Rugby Championship transfers
List of 2022–23 RFU Championship transfers
List of 2022–23 Super Rugby transfers
List of 2022–23 Top 14 transfers
List of 2022–23 Rugby Pro D2 transfers
List of 2022–23 Major League Rugby transfers

References

2022-23
transfers